The 1983 Portuguese legislative election took place on 25 April. The election renewed all 250 members of the Assembly of the Republic.

The last election, in October 1980 had been won by a right-wing coalition, the Democratic Alliance (AD) and Francisco Sá Carneiro had retained office as Prime Minister with an increased majority.

However, Sá Carneiro, along with other important members of the coalition, died in an aircrash only two months after the election, on 4 December 1980. Such happenings caused a massive political instability and Francisco Pinto Balsemão, a senior official of the Social Democratic Party, the largest party in the Alliance, became Prime Minister. But Balsemão lacked support from such senior members of his party as Aníbal Cavaco Silva, and several ministers resigned. Moreover, the right-wing policy was criticized by the left-wing and by the trade unions, and in February 1982, the General Confederation of the Portuguese Workers, with the support of the Communists, called for a general strike that shook the government. The wave of resignations among Balsemão's ministers continued and by the end of 1982, and also influenced by the AD's bad results in the 1982 local elections, Balsemão himself also resigned. 

The Social Democratic Party proposes, to President Ramalho Eanes, a government led by Vítor Crespo, but President Eanes rejects the proposal citing that the political conditions are just too deteriorated, thus he decides to dissolve the Parliament and call an election for April. Shortly after, the AD was dissolved as PSD, CDS and PPM decided to run alone.

The election was won by the Socialist Party with 36%, and Mário Soares was nominated Prime Minister. However, the Socialists lacked a majority in the Assembly of the Republic and were forced to form a coalition with the Social Democrats, which achieved 27%, in what was called the "Central Bloc". Although this coalition allowed Soares to govern, several members of both parties were against it, and internal attacks led to the collapse of the coalition after less than two years. In the election that followed, the Communist-dominated United People Alliance lost 3 MPs and the Democratic and Social Center, after the dissolution of the Democratic Alliance, was now alone in the Parliament with 30 MPs, a loss of 16.  The election marked the beginning of a process of bi-polarization of Portuguese politics.

This was the last legislative election to be won by the Socialist Party until 1995.

Background

Leadership changes

CDS 1983 leadership election
After the dissolution of the Democratic Alliance (AD), Diogo Freitas do Amaral resigned from the party's leadership, and a new congress to elect a new leader was called. Two candidates were on the ballot, Francisco Lucas Pires and Luís Barbosa, with Lucas Pires being elected as new party leader.

|- style="background-color:#E9E9E9"
! align="center" colspan=2 style="width:  60px"|Candidate
! align="center" style="width:  50px"|Votes
! align="center" style="width:  50px"|%
|-
|bgcolor=|
| align=left | Francisco Lucas Pires
| align=center | WIN
| align=right | 
|-
|bgcolor=|
| align=left | Luís Barbosa
| align=center | 
| align=right | 
|-
|- style="background-color:#E9E9E9"
| colspan=2 style="text-align:left;" |   Turnout
| align=right | 
| align=center | 
|-
| colspan="4" align=left|Source:
|}

PSD 1983 nomination selection
Just like CDS, after the collapse of the AD coalition, the then PSD leader Francisco Pinto Balsemão announces he would not run for the leadership of the party. Shortly after, Carlos Mota Pinto is selected by the PSD as the party's candidate for Prime Minister.

|- style="background-color:#E9E9E9"
! align="center" colspan=2 style="width:  60px"|Candidate
! align="center" style="width:  50px"|Votes
! align="center" style="width:  50px"|%
|-
|bgcolor=|
| align=left | Carlos Mota Pinto
| align=center | 
| align=right | 100.0
|-
|- style="background-color:#E9E9E9"
| colspan=2 style="text-align:left;" |   Turnout
| align=right | 
| align=center | 
|-
| colspan="4" align=left|Source:
|}

Electoral system 
The Assembly of the Republic has 250 members elected to four-year terms. Governments do not require absolute majority support of the Assembly to hold office, as even if the number of opposers of government is larger than that of the supporters, the number of opposers still needs to be equal or greater than 126 (absolute majority) for both the Government's Programme to be rejected or for a motion of no confidence to be approved.

The number of seats assigned to each district depends on the district magnitude. The use of the d'Hondt method makes for a higher effective threshold than certain other allocation methods such as the Hare quota or Sainte-Laguë method, which are more generous to small parties.

For these elections, and compared with the 1980 elections, the MPs distributed by districts were the following:

Parties 
The table below lists the parties represented in the Assembly of the Republic during the 2nd legislature (1980–1983) and that also contested the elections:

Campaign period

Party slogans

Candidates' debates

Opinion polling

National summary of votes and seats

|-
| colspan=11| 
|- 
! rowspan="2" colspan=2 style="background-color:#E9E9E9" align=left|Parties
! rowspan="2" style="background-color:#E9E9E9" align=right|Votes
! rowspan="2" style="background-color:#E9E9E9" align=right|%
! rowspan="2" style="background-color:#E9E9E9" align=right|±
! colspan="5" style="background-color:#E9E9E9" align="center"|Seats
! rowspan="2" style="background-color:#E9E9E9;text-align:right;" |MPs %/votes %
|- style="background-color:#E9E9E9"
! style="background-color:#E9E9E9;text-align=center|1980
! style="background-color:#E9E9E9;text-align=center|1983
! style="background-color:#E9E9E9" align=right|±
! style="background-color:#E9E9E9" align=right|%
! style="background-color:#E9E9E9" align=right|±
|-
| 
|2,061,309||36.11||8.4||66||101||35||40.40||10.8||1.12
|-
| 
|1,554,804||27.24||||82||75||7||30.00||2.8||1.10
|-
| 
|1,031,609||18.07||1.3||41||44||3||17.60||1.2||0.97
|-
| 
|716,705||12.56||||46||30||16||12.00||6.4||0.96
|-
| 
|39,180||0.69||||||0||||0.00||||0.0
|-
| 
|27,635||0.48||||6||0||6||0.00||2.4||0.0
|-
|style="width: 10px" bgcolor=#E2062C align="center" | 
|align=left|People's Democratic Union
|27,260||0.48||0.9||1||0||1||0.00||0.4||0.0
|-
|style="width: 10px" bgcolor=#E2062C align="center" | 
|align=left|People's Democratic Union / PSR
|25,222||0.44||||||0||||0.00||||0.0
|-
| 
|20,995||0.37||0.2||0||0||0||0.00||0.0||0.0
|-
| 
|19,657||0.34||1.1||0||0||0||0.00||0.0||0.0
|-
| 
|13,327||0.23||0.8||0||0||0||0.00||0.0||0.0
|-
| 
|11,500||0.20||||||0||||0.00||||0.0
|-
| 
|6,113||0.11||0.0||0||0||0||0.00||0.0||0.0
|-
| 
|5,523||0.10||0.0||0||0||0||0.00||0.0||0.0
|-
| 
|86||0.00||||||0||||0.00||||0.0
|-
|colspan=2 align=left style="background-color:#E9E9E9"|Total valid 
|width="65" align="right" style="background-color:#E9E9E9"|5,561,011
|width="42" align="right" style="background-color:#E9E9E9"|97.43
|width="42" align="right" style="background-color:#E9E9E9"|0.3
|width="42" align="right" style="background-color:#E9E9E9"|250
|width="42" align="right" style="background-color:#E9E9E9"|250
|width="42" align="right" style="background-color:#E9E9E9"|0
|width="42" align="right" style="background-color:#E9E9E9"|100.00
|width="43" align="right" style="background-color:#E9E9E9"|0.0
|width="40" style="text-align:right;background-color:#E9E9E9"|—
|-
|colspan=2|Blank ballots
|42,494||0.74||0.1||colspan=6 rowspan=4|
|-
|colspan=2|Invalid ballots
|104,276||1.83||0.1
|-
|colspan=2 align=left style="background-color:#E9E9E9"|Total 
|width="65" align="right" style="background-color:#E9E9E9"|5,707,695
|width="42" align="right" style="background-color:#E9E9E9"|100.00
|width="42" align="right" style="background-color:#E9E9E9"|
|-
|colspan=2|Registered voters/turnout
||7,337,064||77.79||6.1
|-
| colspan=11 align=left | Source: Comissão Nacional de Eleições, Mapa oficial. D.R. n.º 121, Suplemento, Série I de 1983-05-26
|}

Distribution by constituency

|- class="unsortable"
!rowspan=2|Constituency!!%!!S!!%!!S!!%!!S!!%!!S
!rowspan=2|TotalS
|- class="unsortable" style="text-align:center;"
!colspan=2 | PS
!colspan=2 | PSD
!colspan=2 | APU
!colspan=2 | CDS
|-
| style="text-align:left;" | Azores
| 31.1
| 2
| style="background:; color:white;"|54.4
| 3
| 3.1
| -
| 4.7
| -
| 5
|-
| style="text-align:left;" | Aveiro
| style="background:; color:white;"|36.6
| 6
| 34.8
| 6
| 7.0
| 1
| 16.4
| 2
| 15
|-
| style="text-align:left;" | Beja
| 28.0
| 2
| 11.8
| -
| style="background:red; color:white;"|49.4
| 3
| 4.1
| -
| 5
|-
| style="text-align:left;" | Braga
| style="background:; color:white;"|39.7
| 7
| 27.0
| 5
| 8.8
| 1
| 18.3
| 3
| 16
|-
| style="text-align:left;" | Bragança
| 30.4
| 1
| style="background:; color:white;"|35.8
| 2
| 4.8
| -
| 20.9
| 1
| 4
|-
| style="text-align:left;" | Castelo Branco
| style="background:; color:white;"|37.1
| 3
| 30.6
| 2
| 11.3
| -
| 13.2
| 1
| 6
|-
| style="text-align:left;" | Coimbra
| style="background:; color:white;"|45.3
| 6
| 27.8
| 3
| 10.7
| 1
| 10.2
| 1
| 11
|-
| style="text-align:left;" |  Évora
| 23.9
| 1
| 18.6
| 1
| style="background:red; color:white;"|47.6
| 3
| 4.5
| -
| 5
|-
| style="text-align:left;" | Faro
| style="background:; color:white;"|43.2
| 5
| 23.1
| 2
| 18.6
| 2
| 7.4
| -
| 9
|-
| style="text-align:left;" | Guarda
| style="background:; color:white;"|33.5
| 2
| 31.5
| 2
| 4.9
| -
| 23.8
| 1
| 5
|-
| style="text-align:left;" | Leiria
| 32.7
| 4
| style="background:; color:white;"|35.6
| 4
| 9.5
| 1
| 16.2
| 2
| 11
|-
| style="text-align:left;" | Lisbon
| style="background:; color:white;"|35.8
| 21
| 21.8
| 13
| 25.3
| 15
| 11.7
| 7
| 56
|-
| style="text-align:left;" | Madeira
| 24.4
| 1
| style="background:; color:white;"|56.2
| 4
| 2.8
| -
| 8.2
| -
| 5
|-
| style="text-align:left;" | Portalegre
| style="background:; color:white;"|38.5
| 2
| 19.1
| 1
| 28.7
| 1
| 7.5
| -
| 4
|-
| style="text-align:left;" | Porto
| style="background:; color:white;"|43.0
| 18
| 26.2
| 10
| 13.6
| 5
| 12.5
| 5
| 38
|-
| style="text-align:left;" | Santarém
| style="background:; color:white;"|38.4
| 5
| 24.7
| 3
| 20.0
| 3
| 10.0
| 1
| 12
|-
| style="text-align:left;" | Setúbal
| 30.6
| 6
| 12.7
| 2
| style="background:red; color:white;"|45.8
| 8
| 5.1
| 1
| 17
|-
| style="text-align:left;" | Viana do Castelo
| 32.5
| 2
| style="background:; color:white;"|32.6
| 3
| 9.9
| -
| 18.4
| 1
| 6
|-
| style="text-align:left;" | Vila Real
| 32.3
| 2
| style="background:; color:white;"|42.0
| 3
| 5.4
| -
| 12.7
| 1
| 6
|-
| style="text-align:left;" | Viseu
| 30.9
| 4
| style="background:; color:white;"|36.6
| 4
| 4.6
| -
| 20.7
| 2
| 10
|-
| style="text-align:left;" | Europe
| style="background:; color:white;"|33.6
| 1
| 31.2
| 1
| 17.1
| -
| 11.1
| -
| 2
|-
| style="text-align:left;" | Outside Europe
| 7.0
| -
| style="background:; color:white;"|48.2
| 1
| 2.8
| -
| 34.1
| 1
| 2
|-
|- class="unsortable" style="background:#E9E9E9"
| style="text-align:left;" | Total
| style="background:; color:white;"|36.1
| 101
| 27.2
| 75
| 18.1
| 44
| 12.6
| 30
| 250
|-
| colspan=10 style="text-align:left;" | Source: Comissão Nacional de Eleições
|}

Maps

Notes

References

External links
Comissão Nacional de Eleições 
Centro de Estudos do Pensamento Político

See also
Politics of Portugal
List of political parties in Portugal
Elections in Portugal

Legislative elections in Portugal
1983 elections in Portugal
April 1983 events in Europe